Phytohabitans is a Gram-positive, aerobic, mesophilic and non-motile genus of bacteria from the family of Micromonosporaceae.

References 

Micromonosporaceae
Bacteria genera